Karen Ramey Burns was an American forensic anthropologist known for work in international human rights. Her specialty was the recovery and identification of human remains in criminal, historical, archaeological, and disaster-related circumstances. She worked on a number of high-profile cases, including the Raboteau Massacre and trial in Haiti, the Río Negro massacre in Guatemala, victims of genocide in Iraqi Kurdistan, the Amelia Earhart search in Kiribati, Fiji, and the Northern Mariana Islands, and the identification of the Kazimierz Pułaski remains in Savannah, Georgia, United States. She was also active in international forensic training and taught human osteology and forensic anthropology at the University of Utah in Salt Lake City. She was a 2007-08 Fulbright Scholar at the University of the Andes in Bogotá, Colombia, where she also worked with  EQUITAS, a non-governmental organization dedicated to helping families of disappeared persons due to the ongoing Colombian conflict.

Burns received her graduate education in forensic anthropology under the direction of the late William R. Maples at the University of Florida and developed experience in major crime laboratory procedures while working for the Georgia Bureau of Investigation, Division of Forensic Sciences. She was a fellow of the American Academy of Forensic Sciences.

She died on January 7, 2012.

Selected works
 Burns, K R (1999, 2007), Forensic Anthropology Training Manual
 Burns, K R (1991) "Protocol for Disinterment and Analysis of Skeletal Remains," in the Manual for the Effective Prevention and Investigation of Extra-Legal, Arbitrary, and Summary Executions, a United Nations publication.
 King, T F, R S Jacobson, K R Burns, and K Spading (2001) Amelia Earhart’s Shoes, Is the Mystery Solved?

References

Year of birth missing
2012 deaths
University of Florida College of Liberal Arts and Sciences alumni
American anthropologists
American women anthropologists
University of Utah faculty
Forensic anthropologists
American women academics
21st-century American women